Alai is a 2003 Indian Tamil-language romantic comedy film directed by Vikram Kumar. The film stars Silambarasan and Trisha, while Raghuvaran, Saranya, and Vivek played supporting roles. The score and soundtrack were composed by Vidyasagar and the film was released on 12 September 2003.

Plot

Aathi and Meera are college students who first meet in a bar and fight for a silly reason. Then Aathi with his friends go to his friend's village and there he sees Meera who is also there with her friends. There some goons on a festival show light on Meera who is wearing a sari. Then Aathi comes and beats the goons. Then Aathi and Meera discover that their best friends love each other and they help them to elope and do them a registered marriage. Then Aathi and Meera return to their houses where they realize they love each other. And much to their surprise their houses are beside each other. Then Aathi tries to tell Meera about his love but she doesn't care. And it is shown that Meera also loves him and then there comes a song called En Ragasiya Kanavugal. And then Aathi goes to Meera's house and sees her talking to her friend about him. Then again a song comes where again Aathi and Meera just romance each other.  And then Aathi's father arranges him marriage with a businessman's daughter because of his debt. And then Aathi and Meera separate and Aathi tries to calm Meera who is crying which is heard by his to be fiancé and she tells that she is not interested in this marriage. After that, Aathi ties the nuptial thread around Meera's neck on the wedding stage with everyone's blessings and Meera happily accepts it.

Cast

Production
Prior to release, the film made headlines when Silambarasan revealed that he was to undergo an image makeover for the film and move away from his "mass image" after appearing in such roles in Kadhal Azhivathillai and Dum.

Release
The film received generally poor reviews with a critic noting "with a wafer thin storyline the director attempts to stretch ones patience with so called humour and Trisha roaming in skimpy dresses. Post release the movie became popular only because of the song called "En Ragasiya Kanavugal".

"Soon after the failure of Alai, it was reported that the lead pair would come together for a project title Malai produced by P L Thenappan, but the project never took off. After a sabbatical following this film, Vikram Kumar returned in 2009 with the successful horror film Yavarum Nalam. Silambarasan and Trisha later came together eventually for the critically acclaimed Vinnaithaandi Varuvaayaa (2010) by Gautham Vasudev Menon, which became a commercial success.

Another reviewer from The Hindu noted that "the youthful exploits of Silambarasan, the glamour of Trisha and the winsome music of Vidyasagar fail to do the trick, for the simple reason that the film lacks a taut screenplay with well-knit episodes.". The film became a financial failure at the box office.

Soundtrack

There are six songs composed by Vidyasagar. Soundtrack received positive reviews. Solakattu Bommai is a re-used tune from Vidyasagar's Malayalam song "Chinga Masam" in Meesha Madhavan.

References

External links

2003 films
Indian romantic comedy films
2000s Tamil-language films
Films scored by Vidyasagar
2003 romantic comedy films